WRXX (95.3 FM) is a radio station licensed to Centralia, Illinois, United States. The station airs a hot adult contemporary format, and is currently owned by Dana Withers' Withers Broadcasting, through licensee WRXX, LLC.

References

External links
WRXX's website

RXX
Hot adult contemporary radio stations in the United States